North Whilborough is a village in Teignbridge, Devon, England in the parish of Kingskerswell. It is near the seaside resort of Torquay.

Villages in Devon